is a Japanese actor and voice actor. He is famous for Japanese dubbing roles for Harrison Ford (Especially for Indiana Jones).

Filmography

Films
 Godzilla vs. Gigan (1972) (Takashi Shima)
 Japan Sinks (1973) (Kataoka)
 The Battle of Port Arthur (1980) (Teisuke Oki)
 Shōsetsu Yoshida Gakkō (1983) (Takakichi Asō)
 The Return of Godzilla (1984) (Secretary Henmi)
 Godzilla, Mothra and King Ghidorah: Giant Monsters All-Out Attack (2001) (Masato Hinogaki)
 Tokyo Ghoul (2017) (Yoshimura)
 Kasane (2018)
 Tokyo Ghoul S (2019) (Yoshimura)
 Old Narcissus (2023)

Television
 Mito Kōmon (1969) (Genjuro, Shichinosuke, etc.)
 Ten to Chi to (1969) (Kōsaka "Danjō" Masanobu)
 Daichūshingura (1971) (Ōno Gun'emon)
 Taiyō ni Hoero! (1972) (Nagasawa (ep. 8), Imai (ep. 101) and Satake (ep. 268))
 Key Hunter (1973)
 Edo o Kiru (1973) (Mukai Kurando)
 Katsu Kaishū (1974) (Enomoto Takeaki)
 Ōedo Sōsamō (1975) (Izaburo)
 Fumō Chitai (1979) (Kaname Kaifu)
 Ōoka Echizen (1982) (Hashimoto)
 Tokugawa Ieyasu (1983) (Mizuno Nobumoto)
 Sanga Moyu (1984) (Orson Aikawa)
 Sanada Taiheiki (1985-86) (Ōtani Yoshitsugu)
 School Wars 2 (1990)
 Seibu Keisatsu Special (2004)
 The Family Game (2013) (Yasuhiko)
 Nobunaga Concerto (2014) (Azai Hisamasa)
 Mikaiketsu Jiken: File. 05 (2016) (Hiro Hiyama)

Theater
 Fiddler on the Roof (1975-1977) Perchik
 The Boys in the Band (a.k.a. Midnight Party) (Hank)
 Les Misérables (1989-2001) (Inspector Javert)
 Kiss of the Spider Woman (1992) (Molina)
 The Sound of Music (1992) (Captain von Trapp)
 My Fair Lady (1993-1994) (Professor Henry Higgins)
 Hamlet (1998) (Claudius)
 Footloose (2001-2002) (Shaw Moore)
 Elisabeth (2004-2010) (Max)
 The Beggar's Opera (2006-2008) (Lockit)
 Me And My Girl (2006) (Sir John Tremayne)
 A Midsummer Night's Dream (2007) (Oberon)
 Copenhagen (2007) (Niels Bohr)
 The 25th Annual Putnam County Spelling Bee (2009) (Vice Principal Douglas Panch)
 Henry VI (2009) (Duke of Suffolk)
 Candide (2010) (Martin)
 Himitsu wa utau (2011) (Sir Hugo Latimer)
 Hamlet (2012-Claudius, 2017-Cornelius)
 Rudolf (2012) (Emperor Franz Joseph)
 The Count of Monte Cristo (2013-2014) (Faria)
 Sister Act (2014) (Monsignor Howard/Monsignor O'Hara)
 August: Osage County (2016) (Beverly Weston)
 Twilight (2018) (Norman Thayer Jr.)
 Little Women (2019) (Mr. Lawrence)
 Joseph and the Amazing Technicolor Dreamcoat (2020-2022) (Jacob)
 Waitress (2021) (Joe)

Theatrical animation
Crayon Shin-chan: The Legend Called Buri Buri 3 Minutes Charge (2005) (Miraiman)
Tensai Bakavon: Yomigaeru Flanders no Inu (2015) (Dante)

Dubbing

Live-action
Harrison Ford
Star Wars Episode IV: A New Hope (1985 NTV edition) (Han Solo)
The Empire Strikes Back (1986 NTV edition) (Han Solo)
Raiders of the Lost Ark (Indiana Jones)
Return of the Jedi (1988 NTV edition) (Han Solo)
Indiana Jones and the Temple of Doom (Indiana Jones)
Indiana Jones and the Last Crusade (Indiana Jones)
The Young Indiana Jones Chronicles (Indiana Jones)
Air Force One (U.S. President James Marshall)
The Devil's Own (2000 NTV edition) (Sergeant Tom O'Meara)
Six Days Seven Nights (2001 Fuji TV edition) (Quinn Harris)
Random Hearts (2003 NTV edition) (Sergeant William 'Dutch' Van Den Broeck)
K-19: The Widowmaker (2006 TV Tokyo edition) (Alexei Vostrikov)
Paranoia (Augustine "Jock" Goddard)
The Expendables 3 (Max Drummer)
Gérard Depardieu
The Count of Monte Cristo (Edmond Dantès)
Les Misérables (Jean Valjean)
Balzac: A Passionate Life (Honoré de Balzac)
 500 Days of Summer (Narrator (Richard McGonagle))
 Angels & Demons (Richter (Stellan Skarsgård))
 Beauty and the Beast (Maurice (Kevin Kline))
 Edge of Darkness (Ronald Craven (Bob Peck))

Animation
The legend of the Christmas tree (Fir Tree)

Awards

References

External links
 Official profile 
 

1944 births
Living people
Male actors from Tianjin
Japanese male film actors
Japanese male television actors
Japanese male stage actors
Japanese male voice actors
Chinese male voice actors